Yamil Romero (born 11 July 1995) is an Argentine footballer who plays for Deportivo Riestra.

During the mid season transfer of the 2017 Malaysia Super League, Yamil joined Pahang FA, replacing Bright Dike. He made his debut for Pahang in a 3-2 loss in the 2017 Malaysia FA Cup final in which he managed to assist one goal.

Honours

Club
Pahang
 Malaysian FA Cup: Runners-up 2017

References

External links
 
 Profile at Eurosport
 

1995 births
Living people
Argentine footballers
Argentine expatriate footballers
Argentina international footballers
Sri Pahang FC players
Juventud Unida Universitario players
Ayia Napa FC players
Boca Juniors footballers
Deportivo Riestra players
Primera Nacional players
Malaysia Super League players
Cypriot Second Division players
Association football midfielders
Argentine expatriate sportspeople in Cyprus
Argentine expatriate sportspeople in Malaysia
Expatriate footballers in Cyprus
Expatriate footballers in Malaysia
People from Berazategui Partido
Sportspeople from Buenos Aires Province